TISH was a Canadian poetry newsletter founded by student-poets at the University of British Columbia in 1961. The publication was edited by a number of Vancouver poets until 1969. The newsletter's poetics were built on those of writers associated with North Carolina's Black Mountain College experiment.

Contributing writers included George Bowering, Fred Wah, Frank Davey, Daphne Marlatt, David Cull, Carol Bolt, Dan McLeod, Robert Hogg, Jamie Reid, and Lionel Kearns. Influenced by the poetry theorist Warren Tallman, the Tish Group also drew inspiration from the Seed Catalogue and Robert Creeley, Robert Duncan, Charles Olson and Jack Spicer.

TISH launched a number of other publications including the alternative newspaper The Georgia Straight, edited by McLeod; the poetry newsletter SUM (1963–65), edited by Wah; the magazine of the long poem Imago (1964–74), edited by Bowering; the journal of writing and theory Open Letter (1965–2013), edited by Davey; the prose journal Periodics (1977–81), edited by Marlatt and Paul de Barros; Motion: A Prose Newsletter, edited by David Cull and Robert Hogg (1962), the TISHBooks imprint, and the online journal Swift Current (1984–1990), edited by Davey and Wah, who described it as the world's first e-magazine.

In 2001, George Fetherling wrote in The Georgia Straight that "the journal [TISH] started by George Bowering, Frank Davey, David Dawson, Jamie Reid and Fred Wah is probably the most influential literary magazine ever produced in Canada, of greater significance than even Preview or First Statement, the two that brought poetic modernism to the country in the 1940s."

References

Further reading
 A Digital History of Canadian Poetry
 Virtual Library of Canadian Small Press
 Author Bank: Warren Tallman at BC Bookworld
 Author Bank: Frank Davey at BC Bookworld
 Author Bank: Fred Wah at BC Bookworld
 Author Bank: George Bowering at BC Bookworld
 Author Bank: Daphne Marlatt at BC Bookworld

1961 establishments in British Columbia
1969 disestablishments in British Columbia
Defunct literary magazines published in Canada
Magazines established in 1961
Magazines disestablished in 1969
Poetry magazines published in Canada
Magazines published in Vancouver
Student magazines published in Canada